Khaled Mansoor Al Baba (born in Syria) is a Syrian football player who plays currently for Al-Taliya in Syria.

International career

International goals
Scores and results table. Syria's goal tally first:

External links

Living people
Association football defenders
Syrian footballers
Syria international footballers
Syrian expatriate footballers
Taliya SC players
Al-Majd players
Expatriate footballers in Bahrain
Expatriate footballers in Jordan
Expatriate footballers in Yemen
Syrian expatriate sportspeople in Bahrain
Syrian expatriate sportspeople in Jordan
Syrian expatriate sportspeople in Yemen
1982 births
Syrian Premier League players